Deoghar subdivision is an administrative subdivision of the Deoghar district in the Santhal Pargana division in the state of Jharkhand, India.

History
As a result of the Santhal rebellion, Act XXXVII of 1855 was passed by the British Raj, and a separate district called Santhal Pargana was carved out of parts of Birbhum and Bhagalpur districts. Santhal Pargana had four sub-districts – Dumka, Godda, Deoghar and Rajmahal. Subsequently, Santal Pargana district comprised Dumka, Deoghar, Sahibganj, Godda, Pakur and Jamtara sub-divisions. In 1983 Deoghar, Sahibganj  and Godda subdivisions were given district status.

Administrative set up
Deoghar district has two subdivisions: Deoghar and Madhupur. Deoghar, Mohanpur, Sarwan, Devipur and Sonaraithari  community development blocks and Deoghar city are in Deoghar subdivision.

Note: The website of the district administration mentions two subdivisions with their names, but does not mention the names of the CD blocks in each subdivision. The District Census Handbook,Deoghar, mentions only 8 CD blocks (4 in each subdivision), and leaves out 2 CD blocks. According to the map of the district, it seems logical that, among the two left out blocks, Sonaraithari CD block is in Deoghar subdivision and Margomunda CD block is in Madhupur subdivision.

Deoghar district has two subdivisions:

Demographics
According to the 2011 Census of India data, Deoghar subdivision, in Deoghar district, had a total population of 795,822. There were 416,414 (52%) males and 379,418 (48%) females. Scheduled castes numbered 112,074 (14.08%) and scheduled tribes numbered 58,649 (7.37%). Literacy rate was 55.58%.

See also – List of Jharkhand districts ranked by literacy rate

Police stations
Police stations in Deoghar subdivision are at:
Town
Kunda
Mahila
Jasidih
Devipur
Mohanpur
Sarwan
Sonaraithri

Blocks
Community development blocks in Deoghar subdivision are:

Education
In 2011, in the CD blocks of Deoghar subdivision out of a total 1,231 inhabited villages there were 189 villages with pre-primary schools, 685 villages with primary schools, 282 villages with middle schools, 24 villages with secondary schools, 20 villages with senior secondary schools, 7 villages with non-formal training centres, 464 villages with no educational facility.
.*Senior secondary schools are also known as Inter colleges in Jharkhand

Healthcare
In 2011, in the CD blocks of Deoghar subdivision there were 28 villages with primary health centres, 49 villages with primary health subcentres, 33 villages with maternity and child welfare centres, 4 villages with allopathic hospitals, 7 villages with dispensaries, 13 villages with veterinary hospitals, 10 villages with family welfare centres, 97 villages with medicine shops.
.*Private medical practitioners, alternative medicine etc. not included

References

Sub-divisions in Jharkhand